Who's Your Daddy is Indian Hindi-language suspense, comedy and drama-based web television series directed by Chirag Arora. The series season 1 was released on 2 April 2020 and the season 2 was released on 29 December 2020. Both seasons were digitally released on ALTBalaji and ZEE5 platform. The web series season 1 is written by Chirag Arora and Jatin Dua while the season 2 has written by Ajaydeep Singh and Jatin Dua.

Season 1 web series starring Rahul Dev, YouTuber Harsh Beniwal, Nikhil Bhambri and Anveshi Jain. Produced by Mitesh Hansa Jethva under the production company name Zee Entertainment Enterprises. Season 2 web series starring Bhavin Bhanushali, Sameeksha Sud, YouTuber Anushka Sharma, Mamik Singh and Vidya Malvade. Produced by Ekta Kapoor under the production company name Balaji Telefilms.

Synopsis 
Season 1

This comedy-drama web series showcase Prem Singh (Rahul Dev) & Soggy (Harsh Beniwal) as a father-son couple. Both of them stays in the location of Delhi depicting the daily adventures activities of Soggy & retired army Prem Singh like they are the coolest family in the town. Soggy owns a DVD shop & rents blue films (porn movies) to high society females and earns a sizeable income. This makes his father a star among the women who rent the DVDs. Amidst this whole chaos, nobody knows Who is the daddy of Soggy's son?

Season 2

A tumultuous journey of Shoosha (Bhavin Bhanushali), a small-town orphaned boy, who is trying to make it on his own in life and during this journey he discovers his odd parents. He falls in love with a girl called Sukoon (Sameeksha Sud) and later finds out that her father could also be his long lost father. A lot of humor and drama ensues during this whirlwind journey and at the end the mystery unfolds about shoosha's real father & mother and what happens to the love of his life.

Cast
Season 1
 Rahul Dev as Prem Singh
 Harsh Beniwal as Soggy, son of Prem Singh
Harsh k as Abhi
 Anveshi Jain as Ms. Chhibber
 Nirmal Rishi as Biji, Mother of Prem Singh
 Lizaa Malik as Mrs. Pammi
 Kasturi Banerjee as Mrs. Das
 Divinaa Thackur as Mehak
Season 2

 Bhavin Bhanushali as Shoosha
 Sameeksha Sud as Sukoon Bagga
 Lata Shukla as Jhai Ji (Batto) Manju Bagga
 Anushka Sharma as Kittu Bijli
 Heer Kaur as Anukriti
 Mamik Singh as Mohak Bagga
 Vidya Malvade as Monika Bagga
 Kartik Sabharwal as Imraan Siddique
 Akashdeep Sabir as Tej Bijli (Jaggi)
 Ashok Awasthi as Lovely
 Sukesh Anand as Raju Mishra
 Mohit Duseja as Apporva Mishra (Appu)
 Navneet Srivastava as Balvinder (Balls)
 Deepika Khanna as Pinky

Episodes

Season 1 (April 2020)

Season 2 (December 2020)

Reception

Critical reception 
Season 1

Pradeep Kamadana of Envoy web gave a review that it is a breezy comedy and a must-watch series. Rahul Dev showed good performance without spoiling the appearance. Harsh Beniwal, Anveshi Jain and Divinaa Thackur did extremely well & justified their performances. The writer and director Chirag Arora had done a great job for thoroughly enjoyable series. On the other hand, he criticized that if there was subtitle provided for Punjabi slang could have reached to more audiences.

Binged has given 5/10 stars on their platform stating that it is partly enjoyable. Criticized that screenplay is inconsistent and narration was superfluous. But also highlighted that the performances of Rahul Dev and Nirmal Rishi were good, the story idea was amazing and the steady humorous sequences.

Pakaao team has given 3/5 stars on their platform stating that it is watchable. The acting of Rahul Dev was great & Harsh Beniwal proved to be a perfect match for Soggy. Cinematography, special effects & editing could have a better scope of improvement. But the direction was nicely done by the director.

Season 2

Binged has given 1/10 star on their platform stating that it is "The Daddy of All Cringe fests". Criticized that screenplay and writing are without purpose or direction, story is terrible which does not make sense. Performance of all the actors are weak and not given any justice. Also the casting selection were poor.

Aparna Hajiris of LetsOTT has given 1/5 star stating that it is "As pointless as blunt pencil". Actors Harmeet Mamik & Vidya Malavade had saved the web series with some performance and their chemistry was good. The script writing didn't make any impact. The screenplay and production quality are not up to the standards as compared to any other Zee5 or AltBalaji show.

Tannavi Sharma of Leisurebyte gave an overall 0.5/5 stars stating that "What Even is This Crass and Unfunny Creation!". The web series is not making any sense and it is falling under cringe category safely. Concept of an orphan looking for his father is a serious story and this web series made fun of it which dealt with insensitive and annoying manner.

References

External links
 
 Who's Your Daddy on ZEE5
Who's Your Daddy on AltBalaji

Indian web series